The Bishop of Kildare and Leighlin  is the ordinary of the Roman Catholic Diocese of Kildare and Leighlin, one of the suffragan dioceses of the Archdiocese of Dublin. The episcopal title takes its name from the towns of Kildare and Old Leighlin in the province of Leinster, Ireland.

The Episcopal see in the town of Carlow where the bishop's seat (Cathedra) is located at the Cathedral Church of the Assumption of the Blessed Virgin Mary.

Between 1678 and 1694, the bishops of Kildare also administered the See of Leighlin. By the decree of the Sacred Congregation for the Propagation of the Faith, the union of the sees of Kildare and Leighlin was approved by Pope Innocent XII on 29 November 1694. However, the first three bishops of the united see continued to each receive a separate appointment as apostolic administrators of Leighlin.

The current bishop is the Most Reverend Denis Nulty who was appointed by Pope Francis on 7 May 2013 and received episcopal ordination at the Cathedral Church of the Assumption of the Blessed Virgin Mary in Carlow on 4 August 2013 from the Most Reverend Diarmuid Martin, Archbishop of Dublin.

List of Bishops of Kildare and Leighlin

Notes

References

 
 
 

Kildare and Leighlin
Religion in County Kildare
Religion in County Carlow
Roman Catholic bishops of Kildare and Leighlin
Bishops of Kildare or Ferns or Leighlin or of Ossory